Please add names of notable painters with a Wikipedia page, in precise English alphabetical order, using U.S. spelling conventions. Country and regional names refer to where painters worked for long periods, not to personal allegiances.

Ahmed Yacoubi (1931–1985), Moroccan painter and story-teller
Saul Yaffie (1898–1957), Scottish artist
Yamagata Hiro (山形博導, born 1948), Japanese artist
Yamaguchi Kayo (山口華楊, 1899–1984), Japanese nihonga painter
Yamamoto Shōun (山本昇雲, 1870–1965), Japanese print designer, painter and illustrator
Taro Yamamoto (1919–1994), American artist
Kiyoshi Yamashita (山下清, 1922–1971), Japanese artist
Tsuruko Yamazaki (山崎つる子, 1925–2019), Japanese visual artist
Yan Hui (顏輝, fl. late 13th century), Chinese painter
Yan Liben (閻立本, 600–673), Chinese painter, administrator and politician
Yanagawa Nobusada (柳川信貞, fl. 1822–1832), Japanese ukiyo-e woodblock print-maker
Yanagawa Shigenobu (柳川重信, 1787–1832), Japanese ukiyo-e artist
Yang Borun (楊伯潤, 1837–1911), Chinese painter, calligrapher and poet 
Yang Buzhi (1098–1167), Chinese ink painter
Yang Jin (楊晉, 1644–1728), Chinese painter
Yang Weizhen (楊維楨, 1296–1370), Chinese painter and calligrapher
Yao Tingmei (姚廷美, fl. late 13th or 14th century), Chinese painter
Nikolai Yaroshenko (1846–1898), Russian painter
Yukihiko Yasuda (安田靫彦, 1884–1978), Japanese painter
Sōtarō Yasui (安井曾太郎, 1888–1955), Japanese painter
Ye Xin (葉欣, fl. 17th, 18th or 19th century), Chinese painter
Jack Butler Yeats (1871–1957), Irish artist
William Yellowlees (1796–1855), Scottish painter
Mary Agnes Yerkes (1886–1989), American painter, photographer and artisan
Yi Inmun (이인문, 1745–1821), Korean court painter
Yi Insang (이인상, 1710–1760), Korean painter and government officer
Yi Jaegwan (이재관, 1783–1837), Korean painter
Yi Yuanji (易元吉, c. 1000 – c. 1064), Chinese painter
Delmer J. Yoakum (1915–1996), American painter, designer and screen-printer
Joseph Yoakum (1886–1972), American artist
Yokoyama Taikan (横山大観, 1868–1958), Japanese nihonga painter
Tetsugoro Yorozu (萬鉄五郎, 1885–1927), Japanese painter
Yosa Buson (与謝蕪村, 1716–1783), Japanese painter and poet
Jiro Yoshihara (吉原治良, 1905–1972), Japanese painter
Chizuko Yoshida (吉田千鶴子, 1924–2017), Japanese artist
Yoshida Hanbei (吉田半兵衛, fl. 1664–1689), Japanese ukiyo-e illustrator
Hiroshi Yoshida (吉田博, 1876–1950), Japanese painter and woodblock print-maker
Tōshi Yoshida (吉田遠志, 1911–1995), Japanese print-maker
Yu Zhiding (禹之鼎, 1647–1709), Chinese painter
Yuan Jiang (袁江, fl. 1722–1735), Chinese imperial painter
Yuan Yao (袁耀, fl. 17th, 18th or 19th century), Chinese painter 
Yue Minjun (岳敏君, born 1962), Chinese painter, sculptor and print-maker
Yun Du-seo (윤두서, 1668–1715), Korean painter and scholar
Yun-Fei Ji (季云飞, born 1963), Chinese/American painter
Yun Shouping (惲壽平, 1633–1690), Chinese painter
Konstantin Yuon (1875–1958), Russian painter and theater designer
Lisa Yuskavage (born 1962), American painter

References
References can be found under each entry.

Y